Paul le Page Barnett (22 November 1949 – 3 February 2020), known by the pen name of John Grant, was a Scottish writer and editor of science fiction, fantasy, and non-fiction.

Biography

Born Paul le Page Barnett in Aberdeen, Scotland, Grant has sometimes written under his own name (Paul Barnett), as Eve Devereux, and under various other pseudonyms; he has also ghostwritten a number of books. The author of some 70 books in all (excluding ghostwritten books), he has published several original novels as well as one novel in the Judge Dredd series and, with Joe Dever, 11 novels and a novella collection in the Legends of Lone Wolf series; edited several anthologies, beginning with Aries 1 (1979) and most recently New Writings in the Fantastic (2007); and has written dozens of nonfiction works, including several relating to fantasy and science fiction. His collaborators have included David Langford and, as illustrator, Bob Eggleton. With John Clute, he co-edited The Encyclopedia of Fantasy (1997) for which he also wrote all the cinema entries.  He has written numerous short stories, articles and columns.   Barnett lived in New Jersey with his wife, Pamela Scoville, a noted animation art expert and co-founder with her late husband Michael of the Animation Art Guild. Grant died in February 2020 at the age of 70.

Bibliography

 
 Planet Earth: An Encyclopedia of Geology, 1977, as Paul Barnett (co-editor with Anthony Hallam & Peter Hutchinson)
 Aries I, 1979, edited as John Grant
 Phaidon Concise Encyclopedia of Science & Technology, 1979, as Paul Barnett, edited by John-David Yule (Contributing Editor)
 The Book of Time, 1980, as John Grant (co-editor with Colin Wilson)
 A Directory of Discarded Ideas, Ashgrove Press 1981, as John Grant
 The Directory of Possibilities, 1981, as John Grant (co-editor with Colin Wilson)
 A Book of Numbers, 1982, as John Grant
 Dreamers: A Geography of Dreamland Ashgrove Press 1983
 The Truth About the Flaming Ghoulies, 1983, as John Grant
 Sex Secrets of Ancient Atlantis, 1986, as John Grant
 Encyclopedia of Walt Disney's Animated Characters, Harper & Row 1987, as John Grant.   (first edition)
 Earthdoom! 1987, as John Grant with David Langford
 The Advanced Trivia Quiz Book, 1987, as John Grant
 Great Mysteries, 1988, as John Grant
 An Introduction to Viking Mythology, 1989, as John Grant
 The Great Unsolved Mysteries of Science, 1989, as John Grant
 Eclipse of the Kai, 1989, as John Grant with Joe Dever
 The Dark Door Opens, 1989, as John Grant with Joe Dever
 The Sword of the Sun, 1989, as John Grant with Joe Dever
 Hunting Wolf, 1990, as John Grant with Joe Dever
 Albion, 1991, as John Grant
 Unexplained Mysteries of the World, 1991, as John Grant
 The Claws of Helgedad, 1991, as John Grant with Joe Dever
 The Sacrifice of Ruanon, 1991, as John Grant with Joe Dever
 The World, 1992, as John Grant
 Monsters, 1992, as John Grant, US title: Monster Mysteries
 The Birthplace, 1992, as John Grant with Joe Dever
 The Book of the Magnakai, 1992, as John Grant with Joe Dever
 Legends of Lone Wolf Omnibus, 1992 as John Grant with Joe Dever
 The Encyclopedia of Science Fiction, 1993 (second edition), edited by John Clute and Peter Nicholls, John Grant technical editor
 Encyclopedia of Walt Disney's Animated Characters 1993 (second edition), as John Grant
 The Tellings, 1993, as John Grant with Joe Dever
 The Lorestone of Varetta, 1993, as John Grant with Joe Dever
 History Book, A Thog the Mighty Text (chapbook), 1994, as John Grant
 The Secret of Kazan-Oud, 1994, as John Grant with Joe Dever
 The Rotting Land, 1994, as John Grant with Joe Dever
 The Hundredfold Problem, 1994, as John Grant
 Dr Jekyll & Mr Hyde, 1995, as John Grant (children's retelling)
 The Encyclopedia of Fantasy and Science Fiction Art Techniques, 1996, as John Grant with Ron Tiner
 The Encyclopedia of Fantasy. edited by John Clute and John Grant, New York: St. Martin's Press, 1997. .
 Strider's Galaxy, [Legend] 1997, as Paul Barnett
 Frankenstein, 1997, as John Grant (children's retelling)
 Strider's Universe, [Orbit] 1998, as Paul Barnett
 Encyclopedia of Walt Disney's Animated Characters, 1998 (third edition), as John Grant
 Enchanted World: The Art of Anne Sudworth, 2000, as John Grant
 Guts, 2001, as John Grant with David Langford
 Masters of Animation, 2001, as John Grant
 The World, 2001, as John Grant (re-issue)
 Albion, 2001, as John Grant (re-issue)
 The Paper Tiger Fantasy Art Gallery, 2002, as Paul Barnett
 Perceptualistics: The Art of Jael, 2002, as John Grant
 Dragonhenge, 2002, as John Grant with Bob Eggleton
 The Far Enough Window, 2002, as John Grant
 Qinmeartha and the Girl-Child LoChi, 2002, as John Grant, part of double book with The Tomb of the Old Ones by Colin Wilson
  The Chesley Awards For Science Fiction & Fantasy Art: A Retrospective, 2003, as John Grant with Elizabeth Humphrey and Pamela D. Scoville.  
 The Hundredfold Problem, 2003, as John Grant (re-issue)
 Earthdoom! 2003, as John Grant with David Langford (re-issue)
 Strange Pleasures 2, 2003, edited as John Grant with Dave Hutchinson
 Take No Prisoners, 2004, as John Grant; story collection
 Digital Art For the 21st Century, 2004, edited as John Grant with Audre Vysniauskas
 The Stardragons, 2005 as John Grant with Bob Eggleton
 Sci-Fi Movies, AAPPL 2006, as John Grant
 Noir Movies, AAPPL 2006, as John Grant
 Life-Size Dragons, 2006, as John Grant with Fred Gambino
 Animated Movies, AAPPL 2006, as John Grant
 Discarded Science: Ideas That Seemed Good at the Time..., Facts, Figures & Fun, 2006 
 Beer, AAPPL, 2006, as Paul Barnett
 New Writings in the Fantastic, 2007, edited as John Grant
 Corrupted Science: Fraud, Ideology and Politics in Science, Facts, Figures & Fun, 2007 
 The Dragons of Manhattan, 2008, as John Grant
 Leaving Fortusa, 2008, as John Grant
 The City In These Pages, PS Publishing, 2008, as John Grant
 Bogus Science: Or, Some People Really Believe These Things, Facts, Figures & Fun, 2009, 
 Denying Science: Conspiracy Theories, Media Distortions, and the War Against Reality, Prometheus Books, 2011, as John Grant
 Warm Words and Otherwise: A Blizzard of Book Reviews, Infinity Plus Books, 2011, as John Grant
 Legends of Lone Wolf Omnibus 1, Dark Quest Books, 2011, as John Grant with Joe Dever
 The Lonely Hunter, PS Publishing, 2012, as John Grant
 Earthdoom!, Dark Quest Books, 2012, as John Grant with David Langford (re-issue)
 A Comprehensive Encyclopedia of Film Noir: The Essential Reference Guide, Applause Theatre & Cinema Books, 2013, as John Grant
 Tell No Lies, Alchemy Press, 2014, as John Grant; story collection
 Debunk It!: How to Stay Sane in a World of Disinformation, Zest, 2014, as John Grant; reprinted as Bullsh*t, MJF Books, 2014, as John Grant
 Spooky Science: Debunking the Pseudoscience of the Afterlife, Sterling, 2015, as John Grant
 Eureka!: 50 Scientists who Shaped Human History, Zest, 2016, as John Grant
 Corrupted Science: Fraud, Ideology and Politics in Science (revised & expanded), See Sharp Press, 2017, as John Grant

Critical studies and reviews of Grant's work
Enchanted world

Awards and nominations

References

External links 
 
 Addenda to the Encyclopedia of Fantasy 
 Profile at Infinity Plus including updated entry from EoF
 
 John Grant at the Encyclopedia of Science Fiction
 John Grant at the Encyclopedia of Fantasy

1949 births
2020 deaths
American speculative fiction critics
British speculative fiction critics
Hugo Award-winning writers
People educated at Strathallan School
Science fiction critics
Scottish fantasy writers
Scottish male novelists
Scottish science fiction writers
World Fantasy Award-winning writers
Writers from Aberdeen
Writers from New Jersey